Gene Bradley (born November 26, 1957) is a former American football quarterback who played two seasons with the New Jersey Generals of the United States Football League. He was drafted by the Buffalo Bills in the second round of the 1980 NFL Draft but never played in a regular-season NFL game. He played college football at Arkansas State University.

References

External links
Just Sports Stats

1957 births
American football quarterbacks
Arkansas State Red Wolves football players
Living people
New Jersey Generals players
People from Arkansas
People from Craighead County, Arkansas
People from Jonesboro, Arkansas
Players of American football from Arkansas